The Dayton Flight are an American professional basketball team based out of Dayton, Ohio, and a member of The Basketball League (TBL).

History
On August 26, 2019, Evelyn Magley, CEO of The Basketball League (TBL), announced a new franchise called the Dayton Flight with Brandon Harper as general manager. The Flight follow previous minor league basketball teams in Dayton, including the Dayton Wings, Dayton Jets, and Dayton Air Strikers.

References

External links

The Basketball League teams
Basketball teams in Ohio
Basketball teams established in 2019
Basketball teams in Dayton, Ohio
2019 establishments in Ohio